Faheem Khan is a criminal from Wasseypur in Dhanbad, Jharkhand, India. He is convicted in Murder, Attempt of Murder, Kidnapping, Assaults charges etc. The Bollywood movie Gangs of Wasseypur which was directed by Anurag Kashyap is based on his life.

References

Year of birth missing (living people)
Living people
Indian Muslims
People from Dhanbad
Indian people convicted of murder